Tregaron Hospital is a community hospital in Tregaron, Wales. It is managed by the Hywel Dda University Health Board.

History
The hospital has its origins in the Aberaeron Union Workhouse which was completed in 1876. It became a facility for the treatment of tuberculosis sufferers known as the King Edward VII Memorial Hospital in 1915. In 2016 the health board made proposals to replace the hospital with a health centre.

References

NHS hospitals in Wales
Hospitals in Ceredigion
Hospitals established in 1876
Hospital buildings completed in 1876
Tregaron
Hywel Dda University Health Board
1876 establishments in Wales